Shirvani Ramazanovich Chalaev (Ширвани Рамазанович  Чалаев) (born Dagestan 16 Nov. 1936) is a Dagestani composer.

His 1971 opera, The Highlanders, was the first Dagestan opera. He has composed children's operas for the Natalya Sats Children's Musical Theatre.

Works
 The Highlanders ("Горцы")
 Mowgli
 King Lear
 Blood wedding
 Hadji Murat after Tolstoy's novel ("Хаджи-Мурат")

Selected recordings
 Chalaev - Kontsert No. 1, 2, Lunnye Pesni - Valentin Feigin (cello), Moscow Symphony Orchestra Fuat Mansurov

References

Living people
Russian composers
Russian male composers
People from Dagestan
Year of birth missing (living people)